Drumtochty Castle is a neo-gothic style castellated mansion erected in 1812 approximately three kilometres north-west of Auchenblae, Kincardineshire, Scotland.  This building stands on the southern edge of Drumtochty Forest.

It was built to the designs of James Gillespie Graham with further extensions c. 1815. Although the design for the extensions was again commissioned from Gillespie Graham, the work was undertaken by the Aberdeen City Architect John Smith. Miller speculates Gillespie Graham could have had a dispute with George Drummond, the owner, but considers Smith’s closer proximity to the site is a more plausible scenario. Gillespie Graham was involved with further additions c. 1839.

During the Second World War, Drumtochty Castle was bought by the Norwegian government-in-exile and used as a boarding school for Norwegian children who were refugees from the German occupation of Norway.

On 1 May 1947, Robert and Elizabeth Langlands, opened a boys’ preparatory school at the Castle, having bought Drumtochty from the Norwegian government. The school closed in 1971. 

Historic Scotland included the castle on the list of category A listed buildings in August 1972.

School alumni
Elspeth Barker (1940–2022), novelist and journalist. (One of five Langlands children) 
Ross Leckie (born 1957), writer.
David MacLennan (1948–2014), actor, writer and producer.
Allan Massie (born 1938), novelist, sports writer and journalist.
Douglas Young (born 1948), solicitor.

References

Castles in Aberdeenshire
Houses in Aberdeenshire
Kincardine and Mearns
Category A listed buildings in Aberdeenshire
Norway in World War II
Norway–United Kingdom relations
Defunct schools in Aberdeenshire
Defunct private schools in Scotland
Defunct preparatory schools in Scotland
Defunct boarding schools in Scotland
Defunct boys' schools in Scotland